John Bowie (born May 11, 1984) is a former American football cornerback. He was drafted by the Oakland Raiders in the fourth round of the 2007 NFL Draft. He played college football at Cincinnati.

Bowie was also a member of the Cleveland Browns, Hartford Colonials, Cincinnati Bengals and Hamilton Tiger-Cats.

Early years
Bowie played high school football at Northland High School.

Professional career

Pre-draft
Bowie timed in at 4.37 in the 40-yard dash.

Oakland Raiders
Bowie was drafted in the 4th round by the Oakland Raiders with the pick the Raiders acquired by trading wide receiver Randy Moss to the New England Patriots. Bowie was placed on injured reserve with a knee injury for the 2008 season on August 25, 2008.

On September 30, 2009, Bowie was waived from the Raiders and subsequently placed on injured reserve. He was released from injured reserve with an injury settlement on November 24.

Cleveland Browns
On February 8, 2010 Bowie was signed to a future contract by the Cleveland Browns. He was waived on June 17, 2010. He was re-signed on August 7, 2010. The Browns waived him on August 31.

Hartford Colonials
Bowie was signed by the Hartford Colonials of the United Football League on September 3, 2010.

Cincinnati Bengals
Bowie was signed by the Cincinnati Bengals practice squad on November 16, 2011.

Hamilton Tiger-Cats
Signed with the Hamilton Tiger-Cats of the Canadian Football League on April 11, 2013. Bowie was released by the club on April 23, 2013 (only 12 days after signing with them).

References

External links
Cincinnati Bearcats bio 
CFL bio

1984 births
Living people
Players of American football from Columbus, Ohio
American football cornerbacks
Cincinnati Bearcats football players
Oakland Raiders players
Cleveland Browns players
Hartford Colonials players